Sue Monteath (born 26 July 1959) is an Australian former soccer player who played for the Australia women's national soccer team between 1978 and 1987 and was captain from 1984 to 1987.

References

1959 births
Australian women's soccer players
Australia women's international soccer players
Living people
Women's association footballers not categorized by position